The Immediate Geographic Region of Três Pontas-Boa Esperança is one of the 10 immediate geographic regions in the Intermediate Geographic Region of Varginha, one of the 70 immediate geographic regions in the Brazilian state of Minas Gerais and one of the 509 of Brazil, created by the National Institute of Geography and Statistics (IBGE) in 2017.

Municipalities 
It comprises 5 municipalities.

 Boa Esperança     
 Coqueiral   
 Ilicínea 
 Santana da Vargem  
 Três Pontas

References 

Geography of Minas Gerais